SINAP may refer to:

Nature preservation
()
 National System of Protected Areas (Colombia), the Colombian national parks administrator
 National System of Protected Areas (Nicaragua), the Nicaraguan national parks administrator

Other uses
 Shanghai Institute of Applied Physics, part of the Chinese Academy of Sciences
 Stroke Improvement National Audit Programme, a clinical audit commissioned by the UK Healthcare Quality Improvement Partnership

Disambiguation pages